The Fresh Breeze Solo is a German paramotor, designed and produced by Fresh Breeze of Wedemark for powered paragliding.

Design and development
The aircraft was designed in the 1980s to comply with German rules which are very stringent regarding safety and noise. It features a paraglider-style high-wing, single-place accommodation and a single  Solo 210 engine in pusher configuration, with a hand throttle control. As is the case with all paramotors, take-off and landing is accomplished by foot.

As the company's first product it was initially known as just the Fresh Breeze, but as other models were added it was renamed the Solo for its fitted engine, the Solo 210.

To comply with German safety requirements the Solo was initially designed with a harness that allowed jettisoning the engine package in flight. This was required to reduce the risk of the pilot drowning in the event of a water landing and also to deal with a possible engine fire in flight. This feature survives in the present day Solo Jettison model. To meet noise requirements the small two-stroke engine has a complex "wrap-around" style exhaust and extra-long muffler system that results in a low sound output. The engine cylinder head is modified to improve cooling and drives a two-bladed carbon fibre propeller.

Variants
Fresh Breeze
Initial name given to the model, as the company's first product.
Solo CB
Model with "comfort bar" flexible push rods that counteract engine torque.
Solo Jettison
In production in 2012, this model retains the jettisonable engine feature of the earliest models.

Specifications (Fresh Breeze)

References

External links

1980s German ultralight aircraft
Single-engined pusher aircraft
Paramotors
Solo